The Isuzu Faster is a pickup truck that was manufactured and marketed by Isuzu between 1972 and 2002 over three generations. The Faster was succeeded worldwide by Isuzu D-Max, except in North America.

First generation (1972–1980) 

Isuzu of Japan introduced the KB20 / 25 series Faster pickup in 1972. The regular wheelbase models were designated "20", while "25" referred to the longer version. Derived from the Isuzu Florian, the Faster shared many components, including doors and the front-end assemblage. It served as a replacement for the Isuzu Wasp, a pickup version of the Bellett which preceded the Florian. Both single and twin headlamp front fascia designs were produced.

Due to the exterior dimensions, and engines offered were found to be in compliance with Japanese regulations, the platform was classed in the favorable "compact" designation, and competed with other Japanese made products sold in Japan at the time.

In most export markets, Isuzu rebranded the Faster as the "Isuzu KB". However, the Faster was often distributed through General Motors (GM) retail channels and sold under the Chevrolet brand as the "Chevrolet LUV"—LUV being an acronym for light utility vehicle. Bedford, the European commercial vehicle subsidiary of GM also offered the vehicle under the "Bedford KB" name.

The Isuzu Faster used a traditional pickup truck chassis with a ladder frame and a leaf spring live axle rear suspension. At the front, the A-arm suspension used an independent configuration. The  wheelbase was similar to its competitors, as was the  cargo bay. Unlike for the preceding Wasp, there was also a long wheelbase version (KB25) which had  between the axles, which made for a  bed.

In 1978, a four-wheel drive version became available, with the KB40 chassis code but sold under the "Faster Rodeo" label in Japan. There was also a double cab (on the longer chassis) version. Sales ended in 1980 when the second generation was introduced. In Japan, an overhead valve engine (G161) was fitted originally; this produces  for a  top speed.

Australia
General Motors-Holden imported the Faster into Australia from November 1972 under the name "Chevrolet LUV", renaming it "Isuzu KB" in 1977 before it was replaced in December 1980 by the second generation model (badged "Holden Rodeo"). Gaining an early reputation for reliability and durability, these original rear-wheel drive models featured a four-speed manual transmission, short-wheelbase construction, and circa  payload capacity.

An update in 1978 expanded the LUV range—now comprising the short-wheelbase KB20 model, the new long-wheelbase KB25 and the four-wheel drive KB40 short-wheelbase. These KB25 and KB40 variants were offered in both cab chassis and utility (pickup) body styles and could be specified with the 1.6-liter gasoline engine or the newly available 1.95-liter inline-four diesel.

North America
Responsibility of sales in North America was delegated to General Motors. Thus, the Isuzu was retailed via Chevrolet dealerships as the "Chevrolet LUV". The only engine was a  SOHC inline-four which produced .

Sales in the United States began in March 1972 as a response to the Datsun and Toyota pickup trucks, as well as Ford's Mazda-built Courier. To circumvent the 25 percent tariff on light trucks (known as the chicken tax), LUVs were imported in cab chassis configuration, which included the entire light truck, less the cargo box or truck bed and were only subject to a 4 percent tariff. Subsequently, a truck bed would be attached to the chassis and the vehicle could be sold as a light truck.

The LUV's exterior was updated slightly for the 1974 model year, but the first major update came in the 1976 model year, when a three-speed automatic transmission option and front disc brakes were added. An exterior refresh and the addition of a  cargo bay option, with longer  wheelbase, brought sales up to 71,145 in 1978. The addition of four-wheel drive for 1979 brought the LUV to the attention of Motor Trend magazine, and earned it their second "Truck of the Year" award. The LUV was the first four-wheel-drive minitruck available and set a new trend. Sales peaked at 100,192.

Second generation (1980–1988) 

The second generation was more commonly marketed worldwide under the Isuzu label (either as the "Isuzu KB" or just plain "Pick Up"). It continued to use the "Rodeo" suffix for the four-wheel drives. The second generation model was the first Isuzu pickup offered in three cab styles: single cab, double cab and "Space Cab" ("Sports Cab" in some markets). Sales in the UK continued as the Bedford KB.

This generation was not shared with the GM North American GMT325 platform, which replaced the North American Chevrolet LUV in 1982.

Australasia

Holden in Australasia distributed the second generation Isuzu Faster between January 1981 and August 1988 as the first generation or KB series "Holden Rodeo", for which production started in December 1980. Early KBs were fitted with circular headlamps and a horizontal four-bar grille, but a 1983 model year facelift in December 1982 brought rectangular lamps with a 12-port grille insert as well as restyled side mirrors.

At launch, Holden made the Rodeo available in utility (pickup) and cab chassis body variants in both rear- (LWB) and four-wheel drive (SWB) layouts. All models featured a floor- or column-mounted four-speed synchromesh manual transmission coupled with the 1.6-liter gasoline or 2.0-liter diesel engines. The 1983 model year update increased these displacements to 1.8- and 2.2-liters, respectively. At the same time a new upmarket "LS" model was issued (coded KB28), fitted with a 2.0-liter gasoline engine and five-speed manual. For the 1984 year model, beginning in February 1984, the 2.0-liter became the base gasoline engine.

The 1985 model from July the same year signaled another facelift, the release of the two-door Space Cab body style, the debut of a new 2.3-liter gasoline engine, and the deletion of the four-speed manual and column-shift selector (making the floor-mounted five-speed manual standard). From March 1986 (1986 model year), the 2.3-liter became the standard gasoline engine and in April the subsequent year, the 1987 models obtained a final facelift with an open rectangular grille design and optional power steering.

Versions with unique local specifications were assembled in New Zealand at GM's Trentham assembly plant. These were also badged as Holdens.

Europe
The second generation KB was introduced in many European markets, not only Britain, as the Bedford KB. In subsequent years continental markets saw a switch to Isuzu badging as General Motors stopped using the Vauxhall and Bedford brands outside of the United Kingdom. Two-wheel-drives were also available on a long wheelbase not offered in combination with four-wheel-drive.

North America

The United States continued to receive the Faster under the "Chevrolet LUV" name for the second generation, introduced in 1980 for the 1981 model year. This new engine gave the rear-wheel drive diesel LUV a fuel economy rating of  city /  highway.

After the 1982 model year, General Motors stopped selling the Chevrolet LUV (although many '82s lingered on forecourts into the next year) in the United States in favor of their own S-10 compact pickup. Meanwhile, Isuzu had sold their version in parallel with the LUV since their 1981 entry to the US market, under the name "Isuzu P'up" (short for "pickup"). Isuzu's version received another grille and other differences to set it apart from the LUV, not the least of which is the giant "ISUZU" block letters on the tailgate. Four-wheel drive was available with either engine but only in short-wheelbase form, though some 4WD long-wheelbase diesel are known to exist, possibly dealer-installed or aftermarket conversions. Because of technology-sharing agreement between GM and Isuzu, the diesel was also offered with the LUV's replacement until 1985. Later, the gasoline engine was upgraded to Isuzu's 1.95-liter four and a turbodiesel version was added, with the turbo standard on diesel-engined 4WD models.

For 1987, the P'up gained a "Spacecab" extended cab model. This was only available in LS or Deluxe trim. Also new was the option of a 2.3-liter gasoline four (standard on 4WDs). Production for the Mexican and Latin American markets did not end until 1994.

South America
As with North America, the Isuzu KB was generally issued under the name "Chevrolet LUV" in South America. Manufactured in Colombia from Japanese complete knock down (CKD) sets, these models entered production in 1980 to be exported to other South American countries, continuing on until the release of the TF series in 1988. At the start, the versions assembled were the K-26 and K-28. It was offered with a 1584 cc (G161Z) engine. This model of the Isuzu KB only was assembled in Chile via CKD kits from Japanese origin.

Third generation (TF; 1988–2002) 
{{Infobox automobile
| name = Third generation
| image = Isuzu TF pickup Euro specification.jpg
| caption = Isuzu TF 4-door pickup (Italy)
| aka = Isuzu Rodeo (Japan and Thailand; 4WD only)Isuzu Faster-Z (Thailand)Isuzu Dragon Eyes (Thailand; 1996–2002)Isuzu Dragon Power  (Thailand; 2000–2002)Isuzu Fuego (Philippines)Isuzu Invader (Malaysia)Isuzu Ippon (Israel)Isuzu KB (South Africa)Isuzu Pickup (North America)Isuzu TFIsuzu TFR (Thailand)Isuzu TT FortigoChevrolet LUVChevrolet T-Series (Egypt)Holden RodeoHonda Tourmaster (Thailand)Opel CampoVauxhall Brava (United Kingdom)Bedford Brava (United Kingdom)Foton SUP (China)Jinbei Jindian SY10 (China)JiangLing Baodian (China)JiangLing Hunter (Philippines)Winnerway ZH6500/ZH1021LU2 (China) Xinkai Century (China) Autorrad Century (China) GMC Dragon (Mexico; 1996–2001)GMC Invader (Mexico; 1998–2002)
| assembly = Chile: GM Chile Arica PlantChina: Beijing (Foton), Shenyang (Jinbei), Chongqing (Qingling), Nanchang (Jiangling)Colombia: GM Colmotores Bogotá PlantJapan: Fujisawa Plant, Fujisawa, KanagawaPhilippines: Dasmariñas (1989–1992) Biñan (1992–2005) (IPC) Portugal: Vendas Novas (ITUK)Thailand: Samrong, Samut PrakanTunisia: Kairouan (IMM)United States: Lafayette, Indiana
| production = 1988–20021992–2016 (China)
| body_style = 2-door pickup truck2-door pickup truck (Space Cab)4-door pickup truck (Crew Cab)
| engine = 2.0 L 4G63 I4 (China - Jiangling)2.2 L I4 (China - Jinbei)2.2 L 115 hp (85 kW) C22NE / 22LE I42.3 L 4ZD1 I42.4 L I4 (China - Jiangling)2.5 L 4ZE3 I4 (China - Qingling Isuzu)2.6 L 4ZE1 I42.5 L 4JA1-T2.1 L td I4 (China - Jinbei)2.2 L td I4 (China - Jinbei)2.4 L td I4 (China - Jinbei)2.8 L 4JB1-T td I43.0 L 4HK1-TC1 td I4 (China - Qingling Isuzu)3.0 L 4JH1-T3.1 L 4JG2-T td I43.1 L LG6 V63.2 L 6VD1 V6 "2.5.L 2500 cc Isuzu C240 (Diesel) (China)
| transmission = 4-speed automatic5-speed manual
| related = Isuzu Wizard (first generation)Isuzu Panther
| wheelbase = 
| length = 
| width = 
}}

For the third generation (TF), introduced in 1988, the domestic Japanese lineup was divided into two, with the "Faster" label used on rear-wheel drive versions with four-wheel drives now sold as the Isuzu Rodeo. Rodeo became the name used in most markets for this car, but the profusion of labels for different markets continued. Versions sold in the Americas were called Isuzu Pickup and Chevrolet LUV. In the United Kingdom, the pickup was called Isuzu TF and also Bedford Brava from 1988 until 1991 when the Bedford brand was dropped and it became the Vauxhall Brava. The Isuzu was also sold in mainland Europe along with the Opel Campo. This Opel branding was also utilized in the Middle East, parts of North Africa and some Asian countries.

Holden Rodeo was the only name used in Australasia, with the Isuzu KB name used in South Africa and some other markets. The names Isuzu Faster-Z, Isuzu TFR, and Honda Tourmaster were used in Thailand. A Thai-market SUV based on the TF was sold as the Thairung Adventure, produced in semi-knocked-down by Thai Rung Union Car. Names used in other markets include: Chevrolet T-Series (Egypt), Isuzu Ippon (Israel), Isuzu Fuego (Philippines), and as the Isuzu Invader in the north-eastern parts of Malaysia (Sabah). License built copies have been sold as the Jinbei SY10 series, Foton Aoling T-Series in China, where the car has served as a basis for innumerable local copies, authorized and unauthorized.

In Japan, two-wheel drive versions were called "Isuzu Faster", with the "Rodeo" name reserved for four-wheel drive units. Japanese sales ended in 1994 without replacement, although export markets continued to receive the vehicle until replaced by the D-Max from 2002.

Isuzu Japan had Yokohama Motor Sales manufacture from 1990-1993 a 4 berth camper on the Isuzu Rodeo TFS55H chassis platform. This was the popular 4WD version which gave offroad accessibility and comfort. This option only came in the 2.8 litre 4JB1T engine option and 5 Speed manual with low/high transferbox. There was no automatic options offered.

The TF series received a facelift in 1997. Styling was changed, with a more rounded look at the front, and a new-look dash similar to that used in the 1995 to 1997 model Isuzu Wizard. In China, where the TF is still built by Isuzu's local joint venture partner Qingling Motors, it received a second facelift at the beginning of 2015.

Australia

Holden introduced the TF series into Australia in 1988, branded as the Holden Rodeo, following on from the name of the previous Isuzu based light truck sold by the brand in Australia. The Holden Rodeo was initially available with a 2.6-liter  inline-four. A 2.8-liter  turbodiesel was introduced soon after. Body styles offered were a two-door single cab, a two-door SpaceCab, with space for two small jump-seats (rarely if ever fitted in Australia) behind the front passengers, and a four-door Crewcab, with space for the driver and four passengers. Several trim levels were available, which included DX (base model), LX (mid-range RWD, top of the 4WD range) and LT (top of the range, only available as an RWD petrol Crewcab).

The facelifted 1997 (1998 model year) Holden Rodeo came with a new trim level, LT Sport, available as a four-wheel Crewcab only. Airbags for the driver and front passenger also became an option. By 1998 the 2.6-liter engine was discontinued and a new engine was offered, a 3.2-liter  V6. This engine was available in both rear- and four-wheel-drive. The rear-wheel-drive version had the same chassis, and thus ride-height as the four-wheel-drive, but without the transfer case and front axle. The 3.2-liter V6 was the most powerful engine in a pickup truck in Australia until it was replaced in 2003 by the new look Rodeo based on the Isuzu D-Max. Accordingly, this engine was the most popular engine in the Rodeo, and the Rodeo sold very well overall, near the sales numbers of the Toyota Hilux, traditionally the best-selling commercial vehicle in Australia.

The Holden Rodeo was updated once again in 2001 for the 2002 model year, with a new diesel engine, a 3.1-liter  direct injection intercooled turbodiesel. The update was also accompanied by minor styling changes, such as clear indicator lenses, and a different grille.

Europe
In Europe, the Isuzu was sold as the TF alongside the rebadged "Opel Campo". It was also sold as the "Isuzu Campo." In the United Kingdom "Vauxhall Brava" badging was used rather than Opel. These received the same updates as did the Isuzu TF in general markets, and a variety of body styles were available, usually coupled with diesel engines.

North America
In North America, the TF series appeared in 1988 as simply the "Isuzu Pickup". Produced at Lafayette, Indiana, Isuzu continued on with the TF until 1996 when it was finally replaced with the Hombre (a badged-engineered Chevrolet S-10). The 2.3-liter version holds the distinction of becoming the last carbureted passenger vehicle sold new in the United States (1994 model year). There was also a heavier, work oriented one-tonne model available. The truck continued to be sold in Mexico, and Latin America until production ended in 2016.

South America
As with the previous KB series generation, South American markets again received the TF models under the "Chevrolet LUV" name. The Chilean assembling works began in 1982, meanwhile in Colombia commenced in 1989, In the assembling process, the local parts usage percentage was high and important for the LUV manufacturing process. In Chile it has to reach 40  percent domestic parts content, meanwhile in Colombia exceeded 70%.

A successful export program beginning in Chile in 1980s to the Andean Community countries: Bolivia, Ecuador and Venezuela; and in 1993 began the exports from Chilean assembled units (in the SpaceCab model only) to Bolivia, Peru, Argentina, Mexico, Uruguay, Paraguay, Colombia, and Venezuela. In total, more than 220,000 units were produced only in Chile, and more than 300.000 in Colombia. From 1999 and to little success, Thai Rung Union Car supplied the Chevrolet plant in Arica, Chile with the unique body panels from their "Isuzu Grand Adventure" model to make the Chevrolet Grand Adventure and the "Chevrolet Grand LUV". The Grand Adventure was a wagon version of the TF'' series pickup.

By the late 1980s, supplementary assembly began in Quito, Ecuador by Omnibus BB Transportes (now General Motors Ecuador) with a 1.6-liter inline-four cylinder engine, making .

In October 2005; was ceased the Isuzu Faster Chilean manufacture. In Colombia, the Isuzu Faster has ceased its production in 2010. The last Faster rolled off the assembly line on May 8, 2010. In both countries, the Isuzu Faster was replaced by the Isuzu D-Max, these firsts units were assembled only in Ecuador and later from vehicles coming from Thailand (2014 onwards).

References

Bibliography

External links 

 LUVTruck.com — Chevrolet LUV information and history

Faster
Vehicles introduced in 1972